Konkani cuisine is the cuisine of the Saraswat Brahmins from the Konkan region on the western coast of India. Konkani cuisine differs within the Saraswat Brahmin subsects and within the Konkan-Canara region. Konkani cuisine originally hails from the Konkan region including Uttara Kannada, Udupi district, Dakshina Kannada, Damaon, and Goa, India. 
Konkani cuisine is popular served in many restaurants throughout the western coast of India, and especially in the cities of Bombay and Bangalore. Each variation has its unique flavour and makes uses of different vegetables and fruits available in the region. Konkani cuisine is usually pesco-vegetarian, except acharyas and purohits who follow a strictly saatvik vegetarian diet.
According the Konkani folklore, fish, meats are regarded as sea vegetables. Historically, they have refrained from eating any terrestrial animals in general.

Lacto-vegetarian Saraswat cuisine

Their curries use a lot of coconut, coconut oil, tamarind, kokum& curry leaves and the cuisine is largely influenced by South Indian cuisine. Three cuisine is very similar to Malvani cuisine of southern Concan and Udupi or Mangalorean cuisine. Their cuisine is less spicy and has less Portuguese cuisine influences than the cuisine of their Goan Catholic counterparts. Hooman ani Xit (fish curry and parboiled rice) is the staple food of the Saraswat Brahmins of Goa, whereas the regular consumption of Indian breads such as puris, chapatis and parathas are seen mainly amongst the Saraswat Brahmin of Maharashtra, India. Satvik Brahmin (sub-set of Saraswat Brahmins), which is a strictly vegetarian cuisine that does not use vegetables that grow underground, such as onions, potatoes, garlic, etc.  Dishes such as Savalem raandaap are prepared among the Bhats (Priests), conservative Goud Saraswat Brahmins and Chitrapur Saraswat Brahmins. This is followed by most Konkani families on festivals like Ganesh Chaturthi follow this style of cooking. On certain days (Mondays in particular), all Saraswat Brahmins eat only vegetarian food. This is particularly true in families whose Kuldevta (clan deity) or other family deities like Mangesh, Nagueshi or any other form of Mahadeva Shiva. In Punjab and  Jammu region, Saraswat Brahmins traditionally observe strict lacto vegetarian diet.

Various Saraswat cuisine

Rajapur Saraswat cuisine
This cuisine forms a part of lacto-vegetarian cuisine. This cuisine has the combination of Goan, Udupi and Malvani cuisine culture.
Khatkhatem, a stew containing at least six vegetables, is popular. Other popular dishes include bhaji or shaak (made from different vegetable curry and fruit), vaal bhaji (a curry/dish made out of drumsticks) usli/Usal (spicy pulses in a thin watery gravy), misal ( topped with fried snacks), tondak (beans combined with cashews), rass (coconut-based dishes), undri (a dish made out of rice flour, jaggery, and coconut), ghawan (a special variant of dosa, which is similar to neer dose, a Tuluva dish) hoomans (different types of curries), karams (vegetable salads), lonche (Indian pickles) and papads/happal (flatbread). Fast foods include Moongacho gathi (curried green gram), botatyache patal bhaji (potato curry), tur dal ross (split pigeon pea curry), etc.

Chitrapur Saraswat cuisine
Chitrapur Saraswat cuisine is unique and its various forms have been published in the Rasachandrika book both in Marathi and English. These are recipes that would have been passed down from mother to daughter or daughter-in-law. The cuisine consists either of curries and vegetables made with ground fresh coconut gratings or tempered beans, sprouts, pulses (dals) garnished with coconut gratings. However, nowadays, for health reasons, the use of coconut gratings is kept to a minimum. 

Typical Bhanap or Amchi (as the Chitrapur Saraswats refer to themselves) dishes are: 
 Batata Song (potatoes cooked with tamarind, onions, garlic, chili powder and turmeric)
 Ambat
 Dalithoy
 Patoleo
 Patrode
 Surnoli
 Kairus (ground coconut base with spices, capsicum, potatoes, tamarind, peanuts and cashews)
 Sukke (ground coconut base, spices and a variety of vegetables like potatoes)
 Knolkhol (kohlrabi), peas, cauliflower, okra
 Ghashees
 Mango pickle made with unripe Apinmedi mango

Pesco-vegetarian cuisine

Most konkani Saraswat Brahmins are pesco-vegetarians. The inclusion of fish in the diet is not looked upon as non-vegetarian. Legend has it that when the Saraswati River dried up, the Saraswats who could not farm were permitted to eat sea food/fish. The fish were euphemistically called sea vegetable or झळकें from ( जल काय -Jal Kaay). Oysters, for example, are sometimes called samudra phalam, or 'sea fruit'.

A typical breakfast in a Saraswat home may include pez (congee) of ukdem tandhul (parboiled rice) and lonche (pickles) and papad. Wealthier homes may serve dosa, idli (in South Canara, Karnataka and other parts of South India) or sannas (in Goa), along with chutney or sambhar. Shevaiyn phann or phow are other breakfast foods occasionally served. Rotis and bhakris are typical types of bread eaten along with tondak or seasoned batatabhaji (potato stir-fry preparation).

Lunch and dinner may feature daat dalitoi and rice (xit, pronounced sheeth) in a Dorke'''s home, whereas Bhanaps would prefer ambat with their rice for kalvani. A typical Saraswat lunch would have sheeth, roass or varann; if the diner is not vegetarian, lunch may include hoomann, bhaji, tondak, lonche, papodd, and toi or kadhi. Kadhi is made to serve the dual purpose of mukhashuddhhi (mouth purification, perhaps after all the relatively spicy stuff) and jeervonn (digestive kadhis include asafoetida, vomvom, jeera, fennel seed). Sometimes the kadhis are seasoned simply with karivel and sanswam (mustard seeds). Typically, this is a watery preparation which the luncher cups in his hand as it is poured onto his plate and drinks it before mixing a small portion of his rice with it to eat at the end of the meal. The most savoured as well as preferred kadhis amongst the Konkani Saraswat Brahmins is the kokumachi kadhi or konkam kadhi. Kokum is a fruit found and grown within the western Konkan coast of India and is commonly used in Saraswat cuisine. Formally it is often said that no meal is complete without kokum khadhi''.

See also

 Goan cuisine
 Bengali cuisine
 Chitrapur Saraswat Brahmin
 Gaud Saraswat Brahmin
 Rajapur Saraswat Brahmin

Notes

References

Konkani cuisine
Indian cuisine by culture
Vegetarian dishes of India
Goan cuisine
Karnataka cuisine
South Indian cuisine
Semi-vegetarianism